ed Lobster is the first independent demo album by the band Baboon.  The band later used the name "ed Lobster" as the record label for their self-titled album which was self-released in 2006.

Track listing
 "Save Me"
 "Dead In The Road"
 "Slow Song"
 "No One's Immune"
 "Infected"
 "Get To Know You"
 "Naked In The Mall"
 "CNN"
 "Fan In My Car"

All songs by Baboon.

Personnel
 Will Johnson - drums
 Andrew Huffstetler - vocals, trombone
 Bart Rogers - bass guitar, backing vocals
 Mike Rudnicki - guitar, backing vocals

1991 albums
Baboon (band) albums